Ogla is a small scenic place in the Pithoragarh district of Uttarakhand state of India in the Didihat tehsil. It lies in the crossroads of Kailash Man sarover pilgrimage highway.

Nearby places include Askot Musk Deer Sanctuary, the Charama army base, and Narayan Nagar. It was at one time road terminus for many villages and the starting point for journeys on foot. Lying among dense pine forests, it leads on to Didihat, Dharchula, Darma Valley, Bhagichaura, Jauljibi, and Kanalichhina and is known as the gateway to Garkha.

Himalayan peaks of India and Nepal such as Panchchuli and  Annapurna are visible from the village. Ogla is rich in Pinus roxburghii, Rhododendron, Myrica, and Quercus forest with rich Bryophyte and Pteridophyte flora.

References

Hill stations in Uttarakhand
Villages in Pithoragarh district

sv:Kumaun